Nijolė Oželytė-Vaitiekūnienė (born March 31, 1954 in Vilnius) is a Lithuanian actress. In 1990, she was among those who signed the Act of the Re-Establishment of the State of Lithuania.

Filmography 
 1974 Ievutė – Žvangutis, dir. Gytis Lukšas 
 1976 Frida – Seklio Kalio nuotykiai, dir. Arūnas Žebriūnas
 1977 Stasė – Vaikinas iš Darbo gatvės, rež. Algirdas Dausa
 1978 Dela – Nebūsiu gangsteris, brangioji, rež. Algimantas Puipa
 1978 Rubė Adam – Veidas taikinyje, rež. Almantas Grikevičius
 1979 Briun – Dead Mountaineer's Hotel, dir. Grigori Kromanov
 1980 Adelė – Dičiaus karjera, dir. Balys Bratkauskas
 1980 Bušė – Kelionė į rojų, dir. Arūnas Žebriūnas
 1980 Maksimova – Aliarmas, dir. Jevgenijus Makarovas
 1981 Airinė – Raudonmedžio rojus, 5 serijos, dir. Bronius Talačka
 1981 Bertina – Amerikietiška tragedija, dir. Marijonas Giedrys
 1981 Kamilė – Arkliavagio duktė, dir. Algimantas Puipa
 1982 Inga – Atsiprašau, dir. Vytautas Žalakevičius
 1983 Stasė – Jo žmonos išpažintis, dir. Almantas Grikevičius
 1984 Ana Zaiceva – Du husarai, dir. Viačeslavas Krištofovičius
 1984 Helga Vedekind – Veik pagal situaciją, dir. Ivanas Gorobecas
 1984 Rožytė – Čia mūsų namai, dir. Saulius Vosylius
 1985 Ana – Legenda apie nemirtingumą, dir. Borisas Savčenko
 1986 Jelena Tarasova – Tik vienas posūkis, dir. Aleksandras Grišinas
 1986 Vera – Skėtis naujavedžiams, rež. Rodionas Nachapetovas
 1987 Katerina Zinkevič – Norite – mylėkite, norite – ne…, dir. Vladimiras Kolosas
 1989 Marusia – Pabaiga, dir. Nikolajus Košeliovas
 2005 Klara Dalrympl – Zebriukas Dryžius

References

 Biography

1954 births
Living people
Lithuanian film actresses
Actresses from Vilnius
Lithuanian television actresses
20th-century Lithuanian actresses